Andrew Uram Jr. (March 21, 1915 – December 9, 1984) was a running back and defensive back in the National Football League who played for the Green Bay Packers.  Uram played collegiate ball for the University of Minnesota before being drafted by the Packers in the 6th round of the 1938 NFL Draft.  He played professionally for six seasons from 1938 to 1943.  After the 1943 NFL season, Uram served in the United States Navy during World War II.  In 1973, Uram was inducted into the Green Bay Packers Hall of Fame.  He died in 1984, at the age of 69.

References

External links
 

1915 births
1984 deaths
American football running backs
American football defensive backs
Camp Peary Pirates football players
Green Bay Packers players
Minnesota Golden Gophers football players
United States Navy personnel of World War II
United States Navy sailors
Players of American football from Minneapolis